Saksham Yadav (7 October 1993 – 7 January 2018) was a male Indian powerlifter and a former powerlifting world champion. He died on 7 January 2018 after suffering injuries received during a vehicle accident.

Biography 

Saksham Yadav was born to a middle-class family in outer Delhi, Nangloi on 7 October 1993. After completing his schooling, he enrolled in an Engineering Course but did not complete it, as he was more interested in 'bodybuilding' and 'powerlifting'. Due to his hard work and dedication, he went on to win numerous state and national powerlifting championships, and he claimed a gold medal in the junior powerlifting world championship in Europe . After emerging as a world champion, he claimed world championship and best sportsperson trophy in the 2017 Powerlifting World Championships which was held in Moscow, Russia. Due to his hard work and helping nature for his fellow powerlifters, he was loved and adored by everyone. His dedication towards powerlifting made him a role model for younger generation. His YouTube videos on powerlifting, deadlift and benchpress have been viewed by thousands of people and liked by many. He is really an inspiration for emerging powerlifters.
He was a very good human being and a true animal lover. He loved dogs and always helped injured animals .

Death 
At around 3:00 am on 7 January 2018, Saksham Yadav was travelling in a Maruti Suzuki Dzire car with five other powerlifters from Delhi where the accident occurred (in foggy conditions) at the Sindhu border (Delhi-Panipat highway): they intended to arrive in Panipat for training. Four of the powerlifters were killed almost immediately in the accident, while Saksham and Rohit were critically injured. They were admitted to the Raja Harish Chandra Hospital. Hours later, at around 6:38 pm, it was confirmed that Saksham Yadav had died due to cardiac arrest, and other causes were confirmed as grievous head injuries and severe internal bleeding.

References 

.....

1993 births
2018 deaths
Indian powerlifters
People from Delhi